is a mountain in the Kitami Mountains. It is located on the border of Nayoro, Ōmu and Shimokawa, Hokkaidō, Japan.

References
 Geographical Survey Institute

Mountains of Hokkaido